DRW College Prep is a public 4-year charter high school located in the Homan Square in Chicago, Illinois. It is a part of the Noble Network of Charter Schools.  DRW College Prep is set to grow to a campus that will serve 800 students grades nine through twelve.

References

External links
Noble Network of Charter Schools
TheCharterSCALE: DRW College Prep

Educational institutions established in 2012
Noble Network of Charter Schools
Public high schools in Chicago
2012 establishments in Illinois